Bryum blindii, commonly known as Blind's bryum moss, is a species of moss belonging to the family Bryaceae.

Taxonomy

Synonyms
Bryum arenarium Saut.

References

blindii